Thomas Piercy is an American clarinetist, and hichiriki player based in New York City, USA and Tokyo, Japan.  Although he studied in the United States, his playing style is heavily influenced by the English school of clarinet playing by his extensive studies with English clarinet virtuoso Gervase de Peyer.

He has been cited by the New York Times for his performances of classical music by Brahms and Beethoven as well as contemporary pieces written specifically for him.

He has performed and premiered many contemporary pieces written for him, including Grammy Award winning and Pulitzer Prize winning American composer Ned Rorem's only piece for clarinet and piano.  He premiered this piece - "Four Colors" - at an 80th birthday concert celebration for Rorem at Carnegie Hall in 2003.

In addition to being a performer of classical and contemporary music, as a teacher he has contributed to books on clarinet studies and clarinet fingerings. He performs on rare large bore, rosewood clarinets hand made for him by Luis Rossi, and Buffet Prestige clarinets with Opperman mouthpieces and barrels.

He studied clarinet, voice and acting at Virginia Commonwealth University, Shenandoah Conservatory (with Dr. Stephen Johnston), Mannes College of Music and the Juilliard School.  He studied clarinet in New York City with Gervase De Peyer and noted American teachers Leon Russianoff and Kalmen Opperman. He also studied hichiriki in Japan.

A versatile artist defying categorization – performing on the Emmy Award-winning Juno Baby CDs and DVDs; playing Rhapsody in Blue with pianist Earl Wild; performing concert improvisations with pianist Donal Fox; performing Mozart with mezzo-soprano Frederica von Stade; playing Broadway songs with Raoul Julia; conducting Cabaret or Rodgers & Hammerstein; working with the composer Leonard Bernstein; appearing in a KRS-ONE music video; recording with members of Maroon 5; - as an instrumentalist, singer, director and music director/conductor and actor, he has performed for Broadway and Off-Broadway, television, radio, video and commercial recordings.

Piercy has performed at many of the world's acclaimed concert halls including Carnegie Hall (NY, NY), Lincoln Center (NY, NY), the Kennedy Center (Washington, DC.), the Dame Myra Hess Memorial Concert Series (Chicago, Illinois), Centre Pompidou (Paris, France), Wigmore Hall (London, England), Accademia di Santa Cecilia (Rome, Italy) and Parthenon (Tokyo, Japan).

He has performed several times at the International Clarinet Festival, the world's largest annual gathering of noted clarinetists, including a concert in memory of Russianoff in 1991, a concert of contemporary American music in Japan in 2005, an all -Ástor Piazzolla program at the 2007 International Clarinet Festival in Vancouver, British Columbia, Canada, and conducting and performing a tango nuevo program of music by Astor Piazzolla and a premiere by Michele Mangani at the 2016 ClarinetFest in Kanasa City, USA.

A recipient of numerous scholarships, prizes and awards, he studied clarinet, voice and conducting at the Juilliard School, Mannes College of Music, Virginia Commonwealth University and Shenandoah Conservatory. Piercy's earliest studies were in both voice and clarinet. He began his college education studying clarinet under Dr. Stephen Johnston at Shenandoah Conservatory and Gailyn Parks at Virginia Commonwealth University. He later moved to New York City to study with Gervase De Peyer under scholarship at Mannes College of Music; he continued to study extensively with De Peyer after leaving Mannes. Piercy later studied with and soon became an assistant to the renowned clarinet pedagogue Leon Russianoff; additional clarinet studies and reed-making studies were undertaken with clarinetist, reed, barrel and mouthpiece maker, and composer Kalmen Opperman. He has had arrangements and transcriptions published by Boosey & Hawkes, and as an assistant to Kalmen Opperman, he contributed to clarinet study books and clarinet compositions published by Carl Fischer, Inc., and Baron Publishing. In demand as a clarinet, sax and voice teacher, many of Piercy's students have gone on to schools and careers in music.

Mr. Piercy is currently the Artistic Director and clarinetist of the Gotham Ensemble. A mixed vocal and instrumental ensemble based in New York City, the Gotham Ensemble premieres, performs and records a wide variety of repertoire, from the Classical to the avant-garde. A New York Times review of Gotham's Merkin Hall, New York City, performance of a program of Olav Thommessen's music specifically encouraged the public to go out and purchase the recordings. After a performance of Ned Rorem's "Ariel" at Weill Recital Hall at Carnegie Hall, Mr. Rorem wrote of Gotham as one of America's important chamber music groups performing new music today. Albany Records released “Gotham Ensemble Plays Ned Rorem” - a CD of Ned Rorem's chamber music featuring the clarinet.

A frequent performer of new music, Mr. Piercy has premiered over 200 new pieces composed for him. The works, for clarinet, bass clarinet or hichiriki, include solo pieces, duos, trios, quartets, larger mixed ensembles, concertos and double concertos. They include a wide variety of styles of music, from contemporary classical to Japanese avant-garde; from the abstract to minimalism; from J-pop to jazz-influenced pieces. Piercy has had the opportunity to work with many of these composers.  The composers have ranged from 18 to 93 years of age.  They come from all walks of life and experience: from university students to university professors; from self-taught composers to composers with Ph.Ds; from emerging composers to composers that have won such prominent awards as the Takemitsu Prize, Grammy Award, Latin Grammy Award, and the Pulitzer Prize.

Ned Rorem, a Pulitzer Prize winner and Grammy Award-winning composer, wrote his only clarinet and piano piece, "Four Colors," for Mr. Piercy. The work had its premiere at an 80th birthday concert celebration for Mr. Rorem at Carnegie Hall in the fall of 2003. A short list of the composers he has worked with and premiered their works (many of them written for him) include Milton Babbitt, Allan Blank, Ed Bland, Wendy Mae Chambers, Elisenda Fábregas, Donal Fox, Daron Hagen, Gilbert Galindo, Masatora Goya, Jennifer Higdon, Benjamin Lees, Yuichi Matsumoto, Jun Nagao, Takeshi Ogawa, Sergey Oskolkov, Robert Xavier Rodriguez, Erin Rogers, Ned Rorem, Hifumi Shimoyama, Olav Anton Thommessen, and many others.

Premieres include works by the following composers:
會田瑞樹  Mizuki Aita, 
AYUO, 
坂野嘉彦   Yoshihiko Banno, 
大胡恵   Kei Daigo, 
藤倉大  Dai Fujikura, 
合屋正虎   Masatora Goya,   
平井 京子 Kyoko Hirai, 
平山 智   Tomo Hirayama,   
細川 俊夫   Toshio Hosokawa,   
一柳慧   Toshi Ichiyanagi, 
井上一平   Ippei Inoue,   
石井美栄子   Mieko Ishii, 
清水一徹   Shimizu Ittetsu, 
伊藤美由紀  Miyuki Ito,   
岩岡一志　Kazushi Iwaoka,   
伊左治直  Sunao Isaji, 
​川上統  Osamu Kawakami,   
川崎真由子  Mayuko Kawasaki,  
橘川琢   Migaku Kitsukawa,   
小林祥恵  Sachie Kobayashi,  
Akari Komura,  
桑原ゆう  Yu Kuwabara,  
増本 伎共子 Kikuko Massumoto, 
松本祐一   Yuichi Matsumoto,   
マクイーン時田深山  Miyama McQueen-Tokita, 
三界秀実   Hidemi Mikai, 
三木稔 Miki Minoru, 
見澤ゆかり  Yukari Misawa,  
森田泰之進   Yasunoshin Morita,   
村松崇継  Takatsugu Muramatsu,   
長生 淳   Jun Nagao,   
Akemi Naito, 
中堀海都　 Kaito Nakahori, 
Kaori Nakano, 
​西村 朗 Akira Nishimura, 
小栗克裕    Katsuhiro Oguri,   
大江千里   Senri Oe,   
大羽田 大輔   Daisuke Ohata,   
Koh Okumura, 
佐原詩音   Shion Sahara, 
酒井健治  Kenji Sakai, 
坂本 龍  Ryuichi Sakamoto, 
Miho Sasaki,   
沢井 忠夫  Tadao Sawai, 
清水チャートリー  Chatori Shimizu,  
下山一二三   Hifumi Shimoyama, 
白藤淳一   Junichi Shirafuji,   
鈴木治行  Haruyuki Suzuki,   
鷹羽弘晃  Hiroaki Takaha,   
高橋久美子 Kumiko Takahashi, 
​田中カレン  Karen Tanaka, 
田中 翔一朗  Shoichiro Tanaka,   
​田口和行  Kazuyuki Taguchi,   
壺井 一歩    Ippo Tsuboi,   
​徳山美奈子 Minako Tokuyama,   
内田輝    Akira Uchida,   
Kenjiro Urata, 
宇澤とも子  Tomoko Uzawa,  
薮田翔一  Shoichi Yabuta,   
山口恭子    Kyoko Yamaguchi,   
山本和智   Kazutomo Yamamoto,  
山本 哲也  Tetsuya Yamamoto,   
吉仲 淳   Atsushi Yoshinaka,   
湯浅譲二   Joji Yuasa, 

Eliane Aberdam, 
Jake Adams, 
Ramin Akhavijou,  
Alyssa Aska, 
Lera Auerbach, 
Armando Ayala, 
Milton Babbit, 
Trevor Bachman, 
Rodrigo Baggio, 
Guy Barash, 
Greg Bartholomew, 
Richard Rodney Bennett, 
Helga Beier, 
Jean-Patrick Besingrand, 
Can Bilir, 
John Bilotta
Susan Brewster, 
Scott Brickman, 
Gordon Francis Blaney, Jr., 
Allan Blank, 
Ed Bland, 
Philippe Bodin, 
David Bohn, 
Seth Boustead, 
Erik Branch,  
Julius Bucsis, 
Canary Burton, 
John Cage, 
Oliver Cameron, 
Utsyo Chakraborty, 
Wendy Mae Chambers, 
Kanokpak Changwitchukarn,  
Yihan Chen, 
Monica Chew, 
Young-Shin Choi, 
William Coble, 
Andy Cohen,  
Steve Cohen, 
Michael Coleman,  
Douglas DaSilva,   
Seth David, 
Andrew Davis,   
Malcolm Dedman,   
David Del Tredici,   
Paul Dice,  
Nick Didkovsky,   
Dominic Dousa, 
Peter Eotvos, 
Alan Elkins, 
Elisenda Fabrégas, 
David Fetherolf, 
Dagmar Feyen, 
Donal Fox, 
Jim Fox, 
Michael Frazier,  
Reiko Fueting, 
Donal Fox, 
Gilbert Galindo,   
Lyudmilla German, 
Gardika Gigih,  
David Gonzalez, 
Jacob Goodman, 
Ulf Grahn,   
Eli Greenhoe,   
Adam Giese, 
Nicolas Gilbert, 
Jacob Goodman, 
Melissa Grey, 
Daron Hagen,   
Jin Hee Han,  
David Heuser,  
Jennifer Higdon,   
Joel Hobbs, 
Kevin Holland, 
Katherine Hoover,    
Cindi Hsu, 
Zhihua Hu, 
Silas Huff, 
Justin Hung, 
Kento Iwasaki,   
Yohei Kurihara, 
Kittiphan Janbuala,  
Wang Jie, 
JP Jofre,   
Emil Khoury, 
Sakiko Kosaka, 
Steven Kreamer, 
Tim Labor, 
Benjamin Lees, 
Paul Yeon Lee, 
Tania León,   
Bin Li  李彬,   
Qi Li, 
Elizabeth Lim,   
David Loeb,   
Piyawat Louilarpprasert,  
Raymond Luedeke,   
Joshua Banks Mailman,  
Matt Mason, 
Eli Marshall,  
Peri Mauer,   
William Mayer, 
Daniel Mihai,   
Dom Minasi,   
Paul Morin, 
Sandro Montalto, 
Luigi Morleo,     
David Morneau, 
Charalambos Navrozidis, 
Alon Nechustan,   
Ian Ng, 
James Soe Nyun, 
Sean O'Boyle, 
Takeshi Ogawa, 
Lucas Oickle, 
Sergey Oskolkov, 
Fernando Otero,  
Manos Panayiotakis, 
Akmal Parwez, 
Joseph Perhson, 
Troy Peters, 
Jonathan Pieslak, 
Russell Platt, 
Gene Pritsker, 
Ugo Raimondi, 
Renaldo Ramai,  
Giuseppe Rapisarda, 
André Ristic, 
Aaron Robinson,  
Robert Xavier Rodriguez, 
Erin Rogers, 
Manly Romero, 
Paul Anthony Romero, 
Ned Rorem, 
Michael Rose, 
Richard Rosenfeld, 
Marjorie Rusche,  
Dana Richardson,   
Aaron Robinson,    
Michael Rose,   
Richard Rosenfeld,    
Michael Schelle, 
Brian Schober, 
David Schober,  
Allen Schulz, 
Thomas Schuttenhelm, 
Edward Schocker,   
Thanakarn Schofield,  
Jose Serebrier, 
Candra Bangun Setyawan,   
Alex Shanafelt, 
Emma Shifrin, 
Bob Siebert, 
Nina Siniakova, 
John Spartan, 
Steven Serpa, 
Bob Siebert, 
Samuel Stokes, 
David Su, 
Dorian Tabb, 
Conrad Tao, 
David Taylor, 
Emilio Teubal, 
Olav Anton Thommessen, 
Daniel Thompson, 
Ruben Toledo, 
Douglas Townsend, 
Frank Warren, 
Dalit Warshaw, 
Frances White, 
Blair Whittington, 
Benjamin Williams, 
Donald Reid Womack, 
Rain Worthington, 
Russell Wimbish,   
David Wolfson, 
Anna Vriend,  
Sebastien Zaczek, 
​Parsa Zandi.

Thomas Piercy - Composer Premieres

TOKYO TO NEW YORK  東京    と   ニューヨーク

"Tokyo to New York"  concerts - under the direction of Thomas Piercy - include a wide variety of styles of music, from Japanese avant-garde to American contemporary classical, minimalism, neo-Romantic, tango- nuevo,  J-pop and jazz-influenced pieces. Since 2005, clarinetist and hichiriki player Thomas Piercy has lived in both NYC and Tokyo and has had the opportunity to work with many of the Japanese and American composers programmed in these concerts.

Following a 2011 call for scores for non-Japanese composers influenced or inspired by Japan ("Nihon no shiten - 日本の視点" - Japanese perspective"), a diverse program was selected from established and emerging composers and these pieces were premiered by Thomas Piercy in New York City in 2012.  This concert was followed with a 2012 call for scores asking Tokyo-based composers to write pieces based on their thoughts about NYC.  The selected compositions were given their world premieres in Tokyo in January, 2013, and their United States premieres in NYC in 2013.  Another "Call for Scores" was completed  in 2013 and twelve compositions by Tokyo-based composers were selected for their World Premieres in Tokyo, Japan in January, 2014.  The "Tokyo  to New York" concert series have continued since then, and since 2012, “Tokyo to New York” has performed over 200 world premieres, and numerous Japan premieres and United States premieres.

Thomas Piercy's  discography includes "Gotham Ensemble Plays Ned Rorem", a CD of chamber music featuring the clarinet (released by Albany Records), "CAFE", a CD of music for clarinet and guitar (released by Tonada Records), the world-premiere recording of Sir Richard Rodney Bennett's "Ballad in Memory of Shirley Horn" and  the Emmy Award winning CD and DVD "Juno Baby."  He can also be heard on commercials, film and theater recordings.

References

New York Times - Classical Music in Review - Published October 30, 1993 - Gotham Ensemble Merkin Concert Hall
Database of Recorded American Music - Gotham Ensemble Plays Ned Rorem

1957 births
Living people
American classical clarinetists
21st-century clarinetists

External Links:
Thomas Piercy 
Thomas Piercy Tokyo to New York 東京  と  ニューヨーク
THOMAS PIERCY HICHIRIKI トーマス・ピアシー  篳篥 THOMAS PIERCY Hichiriki  ~  トーマス・ピアシー ​  篳篥